Gregory Peck (1916–2003) was an American actor who had an extensive career in film, television, radio, and on stage. Peck's breakthrough role was as a Catholic priest who attempts to start a mission in China in the 1944 film The Keys of the Kingdom, for which he received his first nomination for the Academy Award for Best Actor. In the same year, he played Count Vronsky in a radio adaptation of Leo Tolstoy's Anna Karenina. He followed this by starring in Alfred Hitchcock's psychological thriller Spellbound (1945) with Ingrid Bergman. In the late 1940s, Peck received three more nominations for the Academy Award for Best Actor for his roles as a caring father in The Yearling (1946), a journalist who pretends to be Jewish to write an exposé on American anti-semitism in Gentleman's Agreement (1947), and a brave airman in Twelve O'Clock High (1949).

Peck co-founded the theatre company La Jolla Playhouse in 1947 with Dorothy McGuire and Mel Ferrer. He starred in productions of Angel Street and The Male Animal for the company. In 1951, he played Royal Navy officer Horatio Hornblower in the eponymous film, David in the biblical epic David and Bathsheba with Susan Hayward, and a soldier in the western Only the Valiant with Barbara Payton. Two years later, Peck appeared as a journalist who falls in love with a princess in the romantic comedy Roman Holiday (1953) with Audrey Hepburn. During the late 1950s, he portrayed Captain Ahab in Moby Dick (1956), war hero Joseph G. Clemons in Pork Chop Hill (1959), and writer F. Scott Fitzgerald in Beloved Infidel (1959).

He won the Academy Award for Best Actor for his performance as Atticus Finch, a lawyer attempting to exonerate a black man wrongly accused of rape in courtroom drama To Kill a Mockingbird (1962). The role topped the AFI's 50 Greatest Screen Heroes. Seven years later, he appeared in the title role of the western Mackenna's Gold, and as a spy in The Chairman. In the late 1970s, Peck played General Douglas MacArthur in the eponymous 1977 film and Nazi doctor Josef Mengele in The Boys from Brazil (1978). 
    
Peck made his television debut in 1982 by appearing as President Abraham Lincoln in the miniseries The Blue and the Gray. He followed this with the television film The Scarlet and the Black where he portrayed Catholic priest Hugh O'Flaherty who helped Jews and prisoners of war to hide in World War II-era Rome. For his appearance as Father Mapple in the 1998 miniseries Moby Dick, he received the Golden Globe Award for Best Supporting Actor – Series, Miniseries or Television Film and a nomination for a Primetime Emmy.

Film

Television

Stage

Radio

Bibliography

References

External links
 

Peck, Gregory
Peck, Gregory